Verónica Estela Saladín Tolentino (born 21 May 1992) is a weightlifter from the Dominican Republic. She won the silver medal in the women's +87kg event at the 2019 Pan American Games held in Lima, Peru. She is also a three-time silver medalist at the Pan American Weightlifting Championships and a two-time medalist, including gold, at the Central American and Caribbean Games.

Career 

She represented the Dominican Republic at the 2011 Pan American Games held in Guadalajara, Mexico. She finished in 4th place in the women's +75kg event. She also competed in the women's +75 kg event at the 2011 World Weightlifting Championships held in Paris, France.

She won the bronze medal in the women's +75kg Snatch event at the 2014 Pan American Weightlifting Championships held in Santo Domingo, Dominican Republic. She competed in the women's +75kg event at the 2015 Pan American Games held in Toronto, Canada where she did not register a result in the Clean & Jerk. She won the gold medal in the women's +90kg Snatch event at the 2018 Central American and Caribbean Games held in Barranquilla, Colombia. She also won the silver medal in the women's +90kg Clean & Jerk event.

In 2018, she competed in the women's +87kg event at the World Weightlifting Championships in Ashgabat, Turkmenistan. A year later, she competed in the same event at the 2019 World Weightlifting Championships held in Pattaya, Thailand.

In 2019, she won the silver medal in her event at the Pan American Weightlifting Championships held in Guatemala City, Guatemala. She previously also won the silver medal in her event at the Pan American Weightlifting Championships in 2017 and 2018. She won the silver medal in the women's +87kg event at the 2019 Pan American Games held in Lima, Peru.

She represented the Dominican Republic at the 2020 Summer Olympics in Tokyo, Japan. She finished in 7th place in the women's +87kg event.

She won the bronze medal in the women's +87kg Snatch event at the 2022 Pan American Weightlifting Championships held in Bogotá, Colombia.

Achievements

References

External links 
 

Living people
1992 births
Dominican Republic female weightlifters
Weightlifters at the 2011 Pan American Games
Weightlifters at the 2015 Pan American Games
Weightlifters at the 2019 Pan American Games
Medalists at the 2019 Pan American Games
Pan American Games silver medalists for the Dominican Republic
Pan American Games medalists in weightlifting
Weightlifters at the 2020 Summer Olympics
Olympic weightlifters of the Dominican Republic
Pan American Weightlifting Championships medalists
Central American and Caribbean Games medalists in weightlifting
Central American and Caribbean Games gold medalists for the Dominican Republic
Central American and Caribbean Games silver medalists for the Dominican Republic
Competitors at the 2018 Central American and Caribbean Games
People from El Seibo Province
21st-century Dominican Republic women